Tony Jordan (born 1957), is a British television writer

Tony Jordan may also refer to:

 Tony Jordan (politician) (born 1964), American politician
 Tony Jordan (American football) (born 1965), American football player

See also
 Tony Jorden (born 1947), English sportsman
 Antony Jordan (born 1974), American football linebacker
 Anthony Jordan (disambiguation)